Luciana Alone Pereira (born 28 February 1993) is a Brazilian singer and songwriter. Her career began in gospel music with Diante do Trono. In 2010, she released her first album, Lu Alone. In 2011, appeared in the American film Destiny Road.

Biography 

Daughter of Branca and Ian Alone, the four-year-old was invited to sing in Lagoinha Church's  choir, where Lu Alone participated in Diante do Trono recordings.

The family initially released her music independently on through YouTube and MySpace. Through —a MySpace music competition—she met British producer Stuart Epps, who invited her to record an album in England, but she declined at the direction of her father. When she was recording a demo CD, she was introduced to a Som Livre representative. Lu Alone was recorded in 2010 with producer Rubens di Souza and was released on 9 March. An eponymous reality show began airing on Multishow in May. The program followed the singer, from recording through the album's release. Also in May, she opened the Demi Lovato concert in São Paulo, at Via Funchal. The single "Not The Right Day" had about 600,000 downloads in Brazil. She appeared in the 2011 American film Destiny Road, where she plays Lucy, Elizabeth's (Zoe Myers) best friend. She recorded an album in Rio de Janeiro which was released in 2012 that included Portuguese-language songs. The first single, "Tudo Pra Mim", released on 1 September 2011. Five days later, she appeared with the five finalists including Ivete Sangalo and Paula Fernandes, on Multishow Award, but lost. Her appearance resulted in #LuAlone entering Twitter's global trends topics, from São Paulo and Rio de Janeiro.

In 2012, she participated in Lagoinha Church's , where she said she is back to the gospel, leaving the secular music to devote to the Christian community. Lu is part of the evangelical movement Escolhi Esperar. In September 2013, she enrolled in Christ for the Nations Institute (CFNI) in Dallas. On Valentine's Day, Lu Alone released a special single called "À Moda Antiga".

During June and July 2014, she was invited to participate in Diante do Trono's European tour. In August she participated as a choir member during Diante do Trono's recording of Deus Reina in partnership with Gateway Worship. In April 2015, she sang during stylist Patrícia Motta's fashion show.

It is the first Brazilian Christian film to appear on Netflix.

Filmography

Discography

Albums

Singles

Other songs

References

External links

1993 births
Living people
Brazilian women singer-songwriters
Brazilian singer-songwriters
Brazilian Christian religious leaders
Christian music songwriters
Performers of contemporary Christian music
Brazilian gospel singers
English-language singers from Brazil
Brazilian evangelicals
Musicians from Minas Gerais
People from Belo Horizonte
Protestantism in Brazil
21st-century Brazilian singers
21st-century Brazilian women singers